"Norman Fucking Rockwell" is a song by American singer and songwriter Lana Del Rey from her sixth studio album of the same name (2019). The track was written and produced by Del Rey and Jack Antonoff.

The song was nominated for Song of the Year at the 62nd Annual Grammy Awards.

Composition
Lyrically, Norman Fucking Rockwell features Del Rey singing in the first verse about a relationship with an immature man who won't take responsibility for his own faults, then admitting during the chorus he's convinced her to stay with him, though it saddens her. Del Rey overlooks his obvious faults, singing: "Why wait for the best when I could have you?" In an interview with Zane Lowe of the BBC, Del Rey commented on her forthcoming album's title track: "Working with Jack Antonoff, I was in a little bit of a lighter mood because he was so funny. So the title track is called 'Norman Fucking Rockwell' and it's kind of about this guy who is such a genius artist but he thinks he's the shit and he knows it and he, like, won't shut up talking about it."

The song's title is a tongue-in-cheek homage to painter Norman Rockwell, with its lyrics metaphorically painting someone blue in reference to his craft. Rockwell was earlier mentioned by Del Rey in her song "Venice Bitch", which also referenced the idea of being covered in "blue" in reference to feelings of sadness or melancholy.

The song is crafted in the key of C Major, with an Andante Tempo at 77 BPM in   common time.

Critical reception
Upon its release with the rest of the album, the song received critical acclaim. Jenn Pelly of Pitchfork praised the song for its direct, often cheeky lyrics. Rhian Daly of NME compared the song's lyrical themes to Del Rey's previous works.

Awards and nominations

Credits and personnel
Instruments/production
Lana Del Rey – vocals, songwriting, production
Jack Antonoff – songwriting, production, engineering, mixing, keyboards, piano
 Laura Sisk – engineering, mixing
 Jonathan Sher – assistant engineering
 Evan Smith – saxophone
 Phillip Peterson – baritone, cello, flugelbone
 Victoria Parker – violin
 Chris Gehringer – mastering
 Will Quinnell – assistant mastering
Technical
Mastered at Sterling Sound
Recorded at Conway Recording Studios, Los Angeles, United States / House of Breaking Glass, Seattle, United States
Mixed at Conway Recording Studios, Los Angeles, United States

Charts

References

2019 songs
Songs written by Jack Antonoff
Songs written by Lana Del Rey
Lana Del Rey songs